Tregajorran is a hamlet in Cornwall, England.

Notable residents
Richard Trevithick, inventor and mining engineer, was born in the hamlet (then in the ecclesiastical parish of Illogan).

References

Hamlets in Cornwall